The Václav Klaus' Cabinet may refer to:
Václav Klaus' First Cabinet
Václav Klaus' Second Cabinet